Tamara Horacek (born 5 November 1995 in Požega, Croatia) is a Croatian-born French handball player for Metz.

With the French national team she won a silver medal at the 2016 Olympic games and at the 2021 World Championship and  a bronze medal at the 2016 European Women's Handball Championship.

Achievements

Club
EHF European League:
Runner up: 2021 (with Siófok KC)

 French league:
 Winner: 2014, 2016, 2017, 2022 (with Metz Handball)

 French Cup (Coupe de France):
 Winner: 2017, 2022 (with Metz Handball)

National team

 Olympic Games:
 2016: 
 World Championship:
 2021: 
 European Championship:
 2016: 
 Junior World Championship:
 2014: 5th

References

External links

1995 births
Living people
French female handball players
People from Požega, Croatia
French people of Croatian descent